State Road 59 is a north–south road in Central Indiana that covers a distance of about  through five counties.

Route description
State Road 59 begins at State Road 58 (SR 58) and heads north towards Sandborn.  In Sandborn SR 59 has intersection with State Road 67 (SR 67).  Then SR 59 heads north towards Linton where SR 59 is concurrent with State Road 54 (SR 54).  Both route leave Linton on the northwest side of town.  Then north of Linton SR 54 turns west toward Dugger.  SR 59 heads north passing through the east side of Jasonville.  SR 59 heads north from Jasonville towards Clay City where SR 59 has a concurrency with State Road 246.  During the concurrency there is an intersection with State Road 157 in downtown Clay City.  SR 59 heads north from Clay City toward Brazil, on the way to Brazil SR 59 passes under Interstate 70.  In Brazil SR 59 has an intersection with U.S. Route 40 (US 40).  SR 59 leaves Brazil heading north toward Waveland, passing through an intersection with U.S. Route 36 and a concurrency with State Road 236.  In Waveland SR 59 enters from the south and has an intersection with State Road 47.

History 
From 1917 to 1926 SR 59 was number as State Road 9, from Linton to Brazil, after 1926 renumbering this route became part of SR 59.

Major intersections

References

External links

 Indiana Highway Ends - SR 59

059
Transportation in Clay County, Indiana
Transportation in Knox County, Indiana
Transportation in Greene County, Indiana
Transportation in Montgomery County, Indiana
Transportation in Parke County, Indiana